Louis Rene Gaiennie (June 9, 1878 – November 25, 1942) was a United States Marine who earned the Medal of Honor for his actions as part of the China Relief Expedition from July 21 to August 17, 1900, in Peking, China, during the Boxer Rebellion.

Gaiennie was born in St. Louis, Missouri.

Medal of Honor citation
His official Medal of Honor citation reads:
In the presence of the enemy during the action at Peking, China, 21 July to 17 August 1900, Gaiennie distinguished himself by meritorious conduct.

See also

List of Medal of Honor recipients

References

External links
 Home of Heroes

1878 births
1942 deaths
Military personnel from St. Louis
United States Marines
American military personnel of the Boxer Rebellion
United States Marine Corps Medal of Honor recipients
Boxer Rebellion recipients of the Medal of Honor